Marco Antonio Montes de Oca (August 3, 1932 - February 7, 2009) was a Mexican poet and painter.

Montes de Oca was a prolific and influential poet whose principal books include: Ruina de la infame Babilonia (1953), and Delante de la luz cantan los pájaros (1959), which won the Xavier Villaurrutia Prize. He also wrote a self-titled memoir in 1967, and a book of short stories Las fuentes legendarias (1966), and also dedicated a lot of time to painting and sculpturing.

Some of Montes de Oca's poetry was translated into English by Laura Villaseñor, including the books: The heart of the flute in 1978 (with an introduction by Octavio Paz), and Twenty-One Poems in 1982.

He died of a heart attack in Mexico City on February 7, 2009.

Works

Poetry

 Ruina de la infame Babilonia (Stylo, 1953)
 Contrapunto de la fe (Los Presentes, 1955)
 Pliego de testimonios (Metáfora, 1956)
 Delante de la luz cantan los pájaros (FCE, Letras Mexicanas, 1959)
 Cantos al sol que no se alcanza (FCE, 1961)
 Fundación del entusiasmo (UNAM, Poemas y Ensayos, 1963)
 La parcela en el edén (Pájaro Cascabel, 1964)
 Vendimia del juglar (Joaquín Mortiz, Las Dos Orillas, 1965)
 Pedir el fuego (Joaquín Mortiz, 1968)
 Lugares donde el espacio cicatriza (Joaquín Mortiz, Las Dos Orillas, 1974)
 Se llama como quieras (UNAM, Poemas y Ensayos, 1974)
 Las constelaciones secretas (FCE, 1976)
 En honor de las palabras (Joaquín Mortiz, 1979)
 Migraciones y vísperas (Oasis, 1983)
 Cuenta nueva y otros poemas (Martín Casillas, 1983)
 Tablero de orientaciones (Premiá, 1984)
 Vaivén (Joaquín Mortiz, 1986)
 Altanoche (SEP, Lecturas Mexicanas, 1986)
 Vocación tras la ventana (bilingüe) (Centro de Estudios Universitarios Londres, 1998)

Short Stories

 Las fuentes legendarias (Joaquín Mortiz, 1966)

Memoir

 Marco Antonio Montes de Oca (Empresas Editoriales, 1967)

Anthologies

 Poesía reunida (1953–1970) (FCE, Letras Mexicanas, 1971)
 El surco y la brasa (FCE, Letras Mexicanas, 1974) Traducciones, en colaboración con Ana Luisa Vega.
 Poesía, crimen y prisión (Secretaría de Gobernación, 1975)
 Comparecencias (poesía 1968–1980) (Seix Barral, 1980)
 Pedir el fuego (antología 1953–1991) (Joaquín Mortiz/CONACULTA, 1992)
 Delante de la luz cantan los pájaros (Poesía 1953-2000) (FCE, Letras Mexicanas, 2000)

References 

1932 births
2009 deaths
Writers from Mexico City
Mexican male poets
20th-century Mexican painters
Mexican male painters
20th-century Mexican poets
20th-century Mexican male writers
20th-century Mexican male artists